Telephone numbers in India are administered under the National Numbering Plan of 2003 by the Department of Telecommunications of the Government of India. The numbering plan was last updated in 2015. The country code "91" was assigned to India by the International Telecommunication Union in the 1960s.

Fixed-line (landline) numbers
Subscriber trunk dialling (STD) codes are assigned to each city, town and village. These codes can be between 2 and 8 digits long, with the largest metropolitan areas and cities having the shortest (two-digit) codes:
11   - New Delhi, Delhi
22   - Mumbai, Maharashtra
33   - Kolkata, West Bengal
44   - Chennai, Tamil Nadu
20   - Pune, Maharashtra
40   - Hyderabad, Telangana
79   - Ahmedabad, Gujarat
80   - Bengaluru, Karnataka

Second-tier cities and metropolitan areas, as well as large or particularly significant towns have three-digit area codes:

120  - Ghaziabad and Noida, Uttar Pradesh
124  - Gurugram, Haryana
129  - Faridabad, Haryana
135  - Dehradun, Uttarakhand
141  - Jaipur, Rajasthan
160  - Kharar, Punjab
161  - Ludhiana, Punjab
172  - Chandigarh Capital Region, Chandigarh, Punjab and Haryana
175  - Patiala, Punjab
181  - Jalandhar, Punjab
183 - Amritsar, Punjab
233  - Sangli, Maharashtra
240  - Aurangabad, Maharashtra
241 - Ahmednagar, Maharashtra
250 - Vasai-Virar, Maharashtra
251 - Kalyan-Dombivli, Maharashtra
253 - Nashik, Maharashtra
257 - Jalgaon, Maharashtra
260 - Daman, Dadra and Nagar Haveli and Daman and Diu
261 - Surat, Gujarat
265 - Vadodara, Gujarat
343 - Durgapur, West Bengal
413 - Puducherry, Puducherry
422 - Coimbatore, Tamil Nadu
431 - Tiruchirappalli, Tamil Nadu 
435 - Kumbakonam, Tamil Nadu 
452 - Madurai, Tamil Nadu
462 - Tirunelveli, Tamil Nadu 
471 - Thiruvananthapuram, Kerala
474 - Kollam, Kerala 
484 - Kochi, Kerala
512 - Kanpur, Uttar Pradesh
522 - Lucknow, Uttar Pradesh
532 - Allahabad, Uttar Pradesh
542 - Varanasi, Uttar Pradesh
551 - Gorakhpur, Uttar Pradesh
562 - Agra, Uttar Pradesh
581 - Bareilly, Uttar Pradesh
591 - Moradabad, Uttar Pradesh
621 - Muzaffarpur, Bihar
612 - Patna, Bihar
641 - Bhagalpur, Bihar
657 - Jamshedpur, Jharkhand
712 - Nagpur, Maharashtra 
721 - Amravati, Maharashtra 
724 - Akola, Maharashtra 
751 - Gwalior, Madhya Pradesh 
761 - Jabalpur, Madhya Pradesh 
821 - Mysore, Karnataka
824 - Mangalore, Karnataka
831 - Belgaum, Karnataka 
836 - Hubli-Dharwad, Karnataka 
866 - Vijayawada, Andhra Pradesh 
870 - Warangal, Telangana
891 - Visakhapatnam, Andhra Pradesh

The first-ever long-distance subscriber trunk dialing (STD) call in India was made between the cities of Kanpur and Lucknow in 1960.

The total length of all phone numbers (area code and the phone number) is constant at 10 digits. For example, the number 7513200000 signifies the area code 751 (the area code for Gwalior) followed by the phone number.

Fixed-line or landline numbers are at most 8 digits long.

Fixed-line operators 
Due to the availability of multiple operators offering fixed-line (landline) services (either wired or wireless), there is an operator code for each telephone number, which is the first digit in the phone number.

For example, a number formatted in the style (020) 3xxx-xxxx represents a fixed-line number in Pune operated by Reliance Communications, while (011) 2xxx-xxxx is a fixed-line number in Delhi operated by MTNL, and (07582) 2xx-xxx is a fixed-line number in Sagar, Madhya Pradesh operated by BSNL.

Format for dialling fixed-line numbers 
No prefix is required to call from one landline to another within the same area code, as variable-length dialling rules apply. A prefix of the number zero + the area code is required to dial from a landline phone in one STD code area to another. The same prefix of the number zero + the area code is required to dial any fixed-line number in India from a mobile phone, irrespective of the area code.

For example, to dial a landline number in Indore, one would have to dial
 from a landline in Indore:  the phone number
 from a landline in Mumbai: 0731 and then the phone number
 from any mobile phone in India: 0731 and then the phone number
 from outside India: +91, then 731, and then the phone number

Before 10 March 2009, as per Department of Telecommunications memorandum dated 9 February 2009. there were some exceptions to this general rule for STD areas falling close to each other  (within a radius of 200 kilometre), where "0" can be replaced with "95" e.g. to dial Delhi from Gurgaon, one dials 9511+landline number.

Mobile numbers 

A typical mobile number in India is "+91 xxxx-nnnnnn". The first four digits initially indicated an operator's code, while the remaining six digits are unique to the subscriber. However, with mobile number portability in place, the first four digits no longer indicate a particular operator.

Short code
There are many businesses in the Indian market who rent keywords on a monthly basis, whose characters on a typical mobile phone keypad represent short codes. Short codes are five digits in length and have to start with the digit '5' like 58888 as of 2007. Previously, they were four-digit in number and could be of any combination, like 8888 or 7827. The current five digits can be extended by three digits further representing 3 additional characters. Messages sent to these short codes are commonly referred to as Premium Rate SMS Messages and have a cost per message depending on the operator as well as the service and the company.

Telemarketing
Telemarketers have been issued 10-digit telephone numbers starting with 140 (140XXXXXXX) by the Department of Telecommunications on TRAI's request.

Notes
1.The Chandigarh Capital Region is a metropolitan area that consists of areas in the union territory of Chandigarh, and the states of Punjab and Haryana.

References

External links
 Department of Telecommunications, Government of India
 Telecom Regulatory Authority of India
 India National Numbering Plan of 2003

 
India
India communications-related lists